The Pite River (Bidumedno in Pite Sami. Piteälven, Pite älv or Piteå älv in Swedish.) is a river in northern Sweden, flowing through the Norrbotten County. It is one of the four major rivers in Norrland that have been left mostly untouched by water power plants, the river has a single dam at Sikfors approximately 15 km upstream from the sea.

It starts in the large lakes in eastern Sweden, such as Tjeggelvas, Vuolvojaure and Labbas, in Jokkmokk Municipality, and flows to the east coast, discharging in the Gulf of Bothnia, in the Piteå Municipality.

It has a length of 400 kilometers, covering an area of 11,200 km².

Its largest waterfall is Storforsen, which has also become the most popular place to visit in Norrbotten. It is located in Älvsbyn Municipality.

See also 
Some of the other large Norrland rivers:
 Kalix River
 Torne River
 Lule River
 Ume River
 Skellefte River
 Angerman River

References

Pite River basin
Rivers of Norrbotten County